Good Will Prevail is the fifth album by the electronic musician Grant Kwiecinski under the pseudonym GRiZ. It was released on September 23, 2016 under his own label All Good Records. It peaked at number 169 on the Billboard 200.

Track listing

References

GRiZ albums
2016 albums